The Nationale Cyclo-Cross Otegem ("Weversmisdagcross") is a cyclo-cross race held in Otegem, Belgium. It's traditionally held the Monday after the Belgian national championships.

Past winners

Men

Women

References
 Results men
 Results Women

Cyclo-cross races
Cycle races in Belgium
Recurring sporting events established in 1980
1980 establishments in Belgium
Sport in West Flanders